Gupta Family Group Alliance (GFG Alliance) is an international group of businesses associated with businessman Sanjeev Gupta and the British Gupta family. Collectively, companies in the alliance are involved in mining, industry and trading.

History

In March 2021, GFG Alliance was struggling to secure new financing after the collapse of one of its lenders, Greensill Capital. GFG was put under brief observation by the German financial regulator BaFin for their business with Greensill.

On 31 March Credit Suisse began insolvency proceedings against Liberty Commodities Limited, a GFG subsidiary, at a London court. The action was brought by another bank, Citigroup, which was acting under instruction from Credit Suisse. It related to Credit Suisse's supply-chain investment funds, worth nearly $10 billion, whose funds were party invested through Greensill Capital, which had placed $3.6 billion in GFG, part of which had funnelled down to LCL. It was expected for the balance sheet of Credit Suisse to absorb significant damage as a result. The bank also launched insolvency proceedings against other entities affiliated with GFG. According to The Wall Street Journal, Credit Suisse would face difficulties in recouping the funds, as Greensill had split up loans backing the funds' investments (including loans granted to GFG Alliance) into a double trust structure. 

On 3 April 2021, it came to light that the Jahama Highland Estates (formerly the "Alcan Estate") had been purchased in 2016 as part of the Rio Tinto Mines deal for the Lochaber aluminium plant, because the furnace requires so much power that the smelter is located near a hydroelectric plant, which drains the basin of the 114,000 acre Estate. Alcan designed all their smelters that way. The Estate includes the north face of Ben Nevis. According to reports, the Scottish National Party mandated that the Estate never be split from the hydro plant and aluminium smelter but Gupta ignored them and placed ownership of the Estate in a company that is domiciled on the Isle of Man. The 2016 deal was worth £330 million and was guaranteed by the UK Chancellor of the Exchequer. Conservative finance spokesperson Murdo Fraser was critical about the alleged breach of the SNP agreement and urged the SNP to "take whatever steps are necessary to protect public funds".

In May 2021 investors began to pay more attention to the sale of GFG Alliance's French steel plants Ascoval and Hayange causing GFG Alliance to hire Rothschild to run an accelerated M&A process of the two assets.

Structure
The GFG Alliance includes:
 Liberty House Group, founded by Sanjeev Gupta in 1992
 SIMEC Group, founded by Gupta's father Parduman K Gupta in 1996
 Wyelands financial services
 Wyelands Bank
 Wyelands Capital
 Jahama Estates
 Jahama Highland Estates, the 5th largest private landowner in Scotland

Miscellaneous divisions
 Alvance Aluminium Poitou, a French aluminium operation
 an aluminium warehouse in Dunkirk France

Lobbying
GFG Alliance's interests are represented to the South Australian parliament by lobbying firm, Bespoke Approach.

References

External links
 Official website

Energy companies of the United Kingdom
Holding companies of the United Kingdom